East View High School is a UIL 5A public high school located in Georgetown, Texas, United States. It is part of the Georgetown Independent School District located in central Williamson County. EVHS is a comprehensive high school. Home of the Patriots, East View High School opened in the Fall of 2008 as the GISD 9th Grade Campus which was recognized by the Texas Education Agency three years in a row.  EVHS received an accountability rating of "Met Standard" from the TEA in 2014 and achieved the following distinctions:

Academic Achievement in Reading/ELA, Academic Achievement in Mathematics, Academic Achievement in Social Studies, Top 25 Percent Closing Performance Gaps, and Postsecondary Readiness.

Athletics
The East View Patriots compete in the following sports:

Baseball, Basketball, Cross Country, Football, Golf, NJROTC, Powerlifting, Soccer, Softball, Swimming, Tennis, Track & Field, Marching band and Color Guard,  Volleyball, and Wrestling.

References

External links
Georgetown ISD

High schools in Williamson County, Texas
Public high schools in Texas